Wing Ning Tsuen is the name of two villages in Hong Kong:
 Wing Ning Tsuen, North District, in the Lung Yeuk Tau area
 Wing Ning Tsuen, Yuen Long District, in the Wang Chau area